Agnieszka Szymańczak (born 11 November 1984) is a Polish cross-country skier.  She competed at the 2014 Winter Olympics in Sochi, in skiathlon and women's classical.

Cross-country skiing results
All results are sourced from the International Ski Federation (FIS).

Olympic Games

World Championships

World Cup

Season standings

References

External links
 
 
 
 
 

1984 births
Living people
Cross-country skiers at the 2014 Winter Olympics
Olympic cross-country skiers of Poland
People from Bielsko County
Polish female cross-country skiers
Sportspeople from Bielsko-Biała